Héctor Michel Camarena (born 4 July 1948) is a Mexican politician affiliated with the Institutional Revolutionary Party. A lawyer by the University of Colima, he served as a Senator of the LVIII and LIX Legislatures of the Mexican Congress representing Colima.

References

1948 births
Living people
Politicians from Coquimatlán, Colima
Members of the Senate of the Republic (Mexico)
Institutional Revolutionary Party politicians
21st-century Mexican politicians
University of Colima alumni
20th-century Mexican lawyers